Pamparama acuta is a moth of the family Noctuidae first described by Christian Friedrich Freyer in 1838. It is found in Asia Minor and the Near East (Turkey, Armenia, Azerbaijan, northern Iraq, Israel, Palestine, Jordan and Lebanon).

Adults are on wing from March to May. There is one generation per year.

References

External links

Further reading

 

Cuculliinae
Moths of Europe
Moths of the Middle East